Mike Tyson vs. Peter McNeeley, billed as He's Back, was a professional boxing match contested on August 19, 1995. The match marked the return of Mike Tyson to professional boxing after over four years away due to his 1991 arrest and subsequent conviction for rape in 1992 which led to Tyson serving three years in prison.

Background
Tyson had twice defeated the number two ranked heavyweight, Donovan "Razor" Ruddock, in 1991. Shortly after his second victory over Ruddock, a blockbuster deal was made that would see Tyson face the Undisputed Heavyweight Champion Evander Holyfield on November 8, 1991. Before this match could take place, however, Tyson was arrested for the rape of 18-year-old Desiree Washington. He was subsequently convicted on February 10, 1992, and then sentenced to six years in prison on March 26. After serving three years, Tyson was paroled on March 25, 1995, and on March 29, he would hold a short press conference that would announce his return to boxing as well as that Don King would remain his promoter. After much debate over who would be Tyson's first opponent in his comeback, including talks about a potential superfight with George Foreman, it was announced that Tyson would face little-known Peter McNeeley on August 19, 1995.

The fight
The fight lasted only 89 seconds with Tyson earning an easy victory via disqualification. McNeeley started the fight by aggressively attacking Tyson as soon as the opening bell rang. Tyson was able to avoid McNeeley's wild punches and land a straight right that dropped McNeeley to the canvas less than 10 seconds into the fight. After taking referee Mills Lane's standing eight count, McNeeley was allowed to continue and again continued his assault on Tyson. The two men exchanged punches in the corner as the first minute of the round passed. Less than 20 seconds later, Tyson landed a right uppercut that again sent McNeeley down. With McNeeley clearly hurt from the exchange, his manager Vinnie Vecchione entered the ring to prevent McNeeley from taking any more damage, causing Lane to end the fight and award Tyson the victory by disqualification.

Aftermath
Highly anticipated, the fight was an overwhelming financial success, grossing $96 million worldwide, including a then-record $63 million in Pay-per-view buys with the fight being purchased by 1.52 million American homes. Tyson later eclipsed this figure with three fights; two in 1996, his rematch with Frank Bruno and a match with Evander Holyfield and then the subsequent 1997 rematch between Tyson and Holyfield.

Undercard
WBA Heavyweight Championship bout:  Bruce Seldon vs.  Joe Hipp
Seldon defeats Hipp by technical knockout in round ten
WBC Lightweight Championship bout:  Miguel Ángel González vs.  Lamar Murphy
González defeats Murphy by majority decision
WBC Light-middleweight Championship bout:  Luis Santana vs.  Terry Norris
Norris defeats Santana by technical knockout in round two
WBC Middleweight Championship bout:  Julian Jackson vs.  Quincy Taylor
Taylor defeats Jackson by technical knockout in round six

References

External links
Sports Illustrated Article on the fight

1995 in boxing
Boxing in Las Vegas
1995 in sports in Nevada
Boxing on Showtime
Mcneeley
August 1995 sports events in the United States
MGM Grand Garden Arena